was a town located in Mitsu District, Okayama Prefecture, Japan.

As of 2003, the town had an estimated population of 6,037 and a density of 42.77 persons per km2. The total area was 141.15 km2.

On October 1, 2004, Kamogawa, along with the town of Kayō (from Jōbō District), was merged to create the town of Kibichūō (in the newly created Kaga District).

Dissolved municipalities of Okayama Prefecture